Matty Island is one of the uninhabited members of the Canadian arctic islands in the Kitikmeot Region, Nunavut. It is located in Rae Strait, between King William Island and the Boothia Peninsula.

Other islands in the area include Beverly Islands to the south, and Tennent Islands to the west.

References

Uninhabited islands of Kitikmeot Region